San Cipriano is a Roman Catholic church in the neighborhood of Infiesto, of the municipality of Piloña, in the autonomous community of Asturias, Spain. The church was established in the 17th century. The interior was burned during the Spanish Civil War.

See also
Asturian architecture
Catholic Church in Spain
Churches in Asturias
List of oldest church buildings

References

Churches in Asturias
17th-century establishments in Spain
17th-century Roman Catholic church buildings in Spain